Pierre Dionne Labelle (born June 4, 1955) is a Canadian politician, who was elected to the House of Commons of Canada in the 2011 election. He represented the electoral district of Rivière-du-Nord as a member of the New Democratic Party.

Prior to being elected, Dionne Labelle was a development agent.

Dionne Labelle joined the Green Party in November 2018.

References

External links

Official website

1955 births
Living people
Green Party of Canada politicians
New Democratic Party MPs
Members of the House of Commons of Canada from Quebec
People from Saint-Jérôme
21st-century Canadian politicians